This was a new event in the ITF Women's Circuit.

The top seeds Stéphanie Foretz and Mandy Minella won the inaugural title, defeating the Dutch-pair Lesley Kerkhove and Arantxa Rus in the final, 6–4, 4–6, [10–4].

Seeds

Draw

References 
 Draw

Kirkland Tennis Challenger - Doubles